Hanna Ereńska (Ereńska-Radzewska), now Hanna Ereńska-Barlo (born 12 November 1946, in Poznań) is a Polish chess Woman Grandmaster.

She was five-time Polish Champion (1971, 1972, 1977, 1979, 1980) and thrice Vice-Champion (1973, 1975, 1984).

She represented Poland in eight Chess Olympiads (1972–1992). She won individual silver medal in the 5th Chess Olympiad at Skopje 1972 (second board, 7½ points of 9 games), and team and individual bronze medals in the 9th Chess Olympiad at La Valletta 1980 (first board, 9 points of 13 games). 

Hanna Ereńska-Radzewska was awarded the WGM title in 1981, as the first Pole. 

Hanna Ereńska-Barlo won the European Senior Chess Championship at Bad Homburg 2005, and the 17th World Senior Chess Championship at Gmunden 2007.

References

External links
 
 

1946 births
Living people
Polish female chess players
Chess woman grandmasters
World Senior Chess Champions
Sportspeople from Poznań
Knights of the Order of Polonia Restituta
Recipients of the Silver Cross of Merit (Poland)